Mian Farhan Latif  is a Pakistani politician who had been a member of the National Assembly of Pakistan between 2002 and 2007. He is a son of Pakistani industrialist Mian Muhammad Latif who is the founder of Chenab Group.

References

Living people
Pakistani MNAs 2002–2007
Year of birth missing (living people)